Gad or GAD may refer to:

Government and politics 
 General Administration Department, of Burma's Ministry of Home Affairs
 Government Actuary's Department, of the Government of the United Kingdom
 Grand Alliance for Democracy, a Philippine political coalition
 People's Liberation Army General Armaments Department

People
 Gad (name), a list of people with the surname, given name or nickname

Places
Gad, West Virginia, flooded in the construction of Summersville Lake, United States
Gad, Wisconsin, an unincorporated community, United States
Gad Cliff, Dorset, England
Gad River, Maharashtra, India
 Gad, a village in Ghilad Commune, Timiș County, Romania

Religion
Gad (son of Jacob), the founder of the tribe of Gad and seventh son of Jacob
Tribe of Gad, a tribe of the ancient Kingdom of Israel
Gad (prophet), King David's seer or prophet
Gad (deity), a pan-Semitic deity worshipped during the Babylonian captivity

Science, medicine, and mathematics 
 Generalized anxiety disorder
 Glutamate decarboxylase, an enzyme in mammals
 Glycoazodyes
 Gadolinium-based MRI contrast agent
 Great dodecahedron, a regular polyhedron

Other uses
 Gaddang language, spoken in the Philippines
 Gender and development
 Northeast Alabama Regional Airport, in Etowah County, Alabama, United States
 General Anthropology Division, of the American Anthropological Association

See also
 GADS (disambiguation)
 Gadd, a surname